The Fellowship of the Ring (1954) is the first volume of The Lord of the Rings (1954–1955) by J. R. R. Tolkien.

The Fellowship of the Ring may also refer to:
 The Lord of the Rings: The Fellowship of the Ring, a 2001 film directed by Peter Jackson
 The Lord of the Rings: The Fellowship of the Ring (soundtrack), soundtrack of the film of the same name
 The Lord of the Rings: The Fellowship of the Ring (video game), a 2002 video game based on the book, but not on the film
 The Fellowship of the Ring: A Software Adventure or Lord of the Rings: Game One, a 1985 computer game
 The Fellowship of the Ring (board game), a 1983 game from Iron Crown Enterprises

See also 
 "The Return of the Fellowship of the Ring to the Two Towers", a 2002 episode of South Park